Burning Questions may refer to:

Burning Questions (album), a 1986 album by James Warren
Burning Questions (Graham Parker album), a 1992 album by Graham Parker
"Burning Questions" (Ugly Betty), an episode of US TV series Ugly Betty

See also
The Burning Question, a 1943 Danish drama film